Janusz Pająk (born 19 February 1944) is a Polish wrestler. He competed in the men's freestyle 70 kg at the 1968 Summer Olympics.

References

1944 births
Living people
Polish male sport wrestlers
Olympic wrestlers of Poland
Wrestlers at the 1968 Summer Olympics
People from Garwolin County
Sportspeople from Masovian Voivodeship